Rosendale is an unincorporated community in Danielson Township, Meeker County, Minnesota, United States.

The community is located along Meeker County Road 28 near its junction with State Highway 4 (MN 4).

Nearby places include Grove City, Cosmos, Atwater, and Litchfield.  Rosendale is 14 miles southwest of Litchfield.

References

Unincorporated communities in Minnesota
Unincorporated communities in Meeker County, Minnesota